Peter A. Ramsey (born December 23, 1962) is an American illustrator, storyboard artist, film director, screenwriter, and film producer. He is best known for directing DreamWorks Animation's Rise of the Guardians (2012), becoming the first African American to direct a major American animated film, and co-directing Sony Pictures Animation's Spider-Man: Into the Spider-Verse (2018). For Spider-Man: Into the Spider-Verse, he became the first African American to be nominated for and win an Academy Award for Best Animated Feature.

Early life
Ramsey grew up in the Crenshaw District of South Los Angeles, and graduated in 1980 from Pali High. He studied painting at UCLA for two years before enrolling in film classes at Los Angeles City College.

Career
His first job in Hollywood was painting a mural, but soon he was working as a storyboard artist and production illustrator on 26 films including Predator 2, Backdraft, Independence Day,  Fight Club and A.I. Artificial Intelligence. He was a second unit director for Poetic Justice, Higher Learning, Tank Girl and Godzilla. Aron Warner, the producer of Tank Girl, suggested he join DreamWorks Animation. After initially being uninterested, Ramsey joined DreamWorks as a story artist for Shrek the Third and Shrek the Halls.

In 2012, he directed Rise of the Guardians, based on William Joyce's The Guardians of Childhood books, making him the first African-American to direct a big-budget animated feature. In 2018, he co-directed Spider-Man: Into the Spider-Verse, which won the 2019 Academy Award for Best Animated Feature. He is set to write and direct Blood Count, a period vampire thriller distributed by Paramount Pictures, as well as the Robert Johnson movie Love is Vain. On April 16, 2021, He was set to direct the film adaptation of the Matthew Quick novel Boy21.

In April 2022, Ramsey had been hired to direct an episode each of the Star Wars streaming series Ahsoka and The Mandalorian season 3, both set to be released in 2023.

Ramsey is a member of AMPAS, the Directors Guild of America and The Animation Guild.

Filmography

Director
 Monsters vs. Aliens: Mutant Pumpkins from Outer Space (2009)
 Rise of the Guardians (2012)
 Spider-Man: Into the Spider-Verse (2018) (co-director with Bob Persichetti and Rodney Rothman)
 We the People (2021) (Segment: Active Citizenship)
 Lost Ollie (2022)
 The Mandalorian (2023)
 Ahsoka (2023)
 Blood Count (TBA)

Second unit director
 Poetic Justice (1993)
 Higher Learning (1995)
 Tank Girl (1995)
 Godzilla (1998)

Storyboard artist
 A Nightmare on Elm Street 5: The Dream Child (1989)
 Predator 2 (1990)
 Tank Girl (1995)
 Mortal Kombat (1995)
 Eye for an Eye (1996)
 Independence Day (1996)
 Men in Black (1997)
 Godzilla (1998)
 Being John Malkovich (1999)
 Fight Club (1999)
 How the Grinch Stole Christmas (2000)
 Cast Away (2000)
 A.I. Artificial Intelligence (2001)
 The Affair of the Necklace (2001)
 Panic Room (2002)
 Minority Report (2002)
 Adaptation. (2002)
 The Core (2003)
 Spartan (2004)
 Shark Tale (2004) (additional)
Shrek the Third (2007)
Shrek the Halls (2007)
 Penguins of Madagascar (2014) (additional)
 Sausage Party (2016) (additional)
 Duck Duck Goose (2018) (additional)
 A Wrinkle in Time (2018)

Illustrator
 Backdraft (1991)
 Far and Away (1992)
 Bram Stoker's Dracula (1992)
 The Shadow (1994)
 Batman Forever (1995)
 EDtv (1999)

Other
 Almost an Angel (1990) (continuity artist)
 Monsters vs. Aliens (2009) (head of story)
 Puss in Boots (2011) (creative consultant)
 Spider-Man: Homecoming (2017) (head of story) 
 Hair Love (2019) (executive producer)
Spider-Man: Across the Spider-Verse (2023) (executive producer)
Spider-Man: Beyond the Spider-Verse (2024) (executive producer)

Awards and nominations

References

External links

1960s births
African-American film directors
African-American illustrators
American animated film directors
American storyboard artists
Annie Award winners
Directors of Best Animated Feature Academy Award winners
DreamWorks Animation people
Emmy Award winners
Film directors from Los Angeles
Hugo Award winners
Living people
People from Crenshaw, Los Angeles
Sony Pictures Animation people